Amar Oli (born 20 August 1980 at Dang district, Nepal) is a film director working primarily in the Nepali film industry for more than a decade. He began his career as an assistant director and actor. Later, he focused his attention on other aspects of film making such as production, cinematography and direction. He has produced and directed several Nepali movies, documentaries and music videos. His work as a director includes movies such as Aarop, Chot and Dhartiputra.

Early life
Oli was passionate about movies since his childhood. In 2005, he got an opportunity to work on a Nepali film as an assistant director.

Filmography

References

1980 births
Living people
Nepalese film directors
People from Dang District, Nepal
Nepalese film producers
Nepalese male actors
21st-century Nepalese film directors